Kokkiligadda-Kothapalem is a village in Krishna district of the Indian state of Andhra Pradesh. It is located in Mopidevi mandal of Machilipatnam revenue division. The village is a part of the Andhra Pradesh Capital Region under the jurisdiction of APCRDA. The nearest town is Challapalli which is 5 km away and the famous Subrahmanyeswara Swamy temple , Mopidevi is also located 5 km away from this village .

See also 
 List of villages in Krishna district

References 

Villages in Krishna district